Dougal and the Blue Cat is a 1970 animated film based on The Magic Roundabout directed by Serge Danot. It was released in France in December 1970 and its English version, narrated by Eric Thompson, like the original series, was released in 1972.

Plot
One morning in the magic garden, after a rude awakening from his cuckoo clock, Dougal the dog remembers a strange event that happened the night before. He then takes the train to speak to Zebedee about it (while briefly conversing with Ermintrude, Brian, Dylan, and Mr. MacHenry on the way). Dougal recounts how, after being awoken and greeted by a strange red owl, he had heard two voices coming from the old treacle factory that had been shut down. The second voice, a female, repeatedly says, "Blue is beautiful, blue is best. I'm blue, I'm beautiful, I'm best!" After the flashback, Zebedee suggests Dougal talk with Florence.

At the roundabout, Florence is greeted by Mr. Rusty and the other kids who show her a surprise: a sly blue cat, who introduces himself as Buxton. After Zebedee arrives and tells Florence of Dougal's dilemma, Florence goes to the garden and introduces Dougal to Buxton. As she takes him to the bridge to meet the other animals, Dougal becomes jealous of the attention directed toward Buxton, and suspicious that the blue cat's arrival might be related to the strange event from the previous night. Sure enough, no one is aware that the blue cat plots to take over the garden.

Sometime later, after taking a nap in Dougal's bed (which Dougal objected), Buxton sneaks off to the treacle factory. He introduces himself to the Blue Voice a.k.a. Madam Blue (Fenella Fielding), who plots to transform everything in the world blue, with everything that isn't blue to be destroyed, while anyone who isn't blue will be imprisoned. Buxton then enters the ruins of the old treacle factory and is crowned King after correctly identifying the colours of seven doors, each coloured different shades of blue.

Back at the garden, the gang finds Dougal, having been previously stuck from an elevated platform, who tries to warn everyone that Buxton is evil. As the cat manages to keep them from suspecting, some of the characters begin to take notice when blue cacti start appearing. A distressed Zebedee arrives, claiming that his moustache has gone missing (in the French version, he somewhat predicted that bad luck would occur, when his moustache began itching earlier in the movie). While the group searches for the magic moustache, Buxton sneaks back to the factory again and orders his army to capture everyone. Every character, except for Dougal, is eventually taken and imprisoned in the factory dungeon. Buxton reveals himself to be in possession of Zebedee's magic moustache, so they are unable to escape with magic.

Upon finding out about his friends from a scarecrow, Dougal has the idea to dye himself blue (in the French version, the scarecrow gives him this idea). Arriving to the factory, he introduces himself to Buxton as Blue Peter and says that he hates sugar. To make sure of this, Buxton proceeds to lock Dougal in a torture chamber, which is a room full of sugar cubes. Dougal faces the dilemma of eating the sugar, and revealing his true identity, or resisting the sugar, thus earning Buxton's trust. He resists, and is released from the room and given the title of Prime Minister.

Dougal takes a "tour" of the caves beneath the treacle factory, and manages to locate his friends in the dungeon, only to be followed by Buxton. Madam Blue then orders the two to conquer the Moon (and paint it blue, as revealed in the French version). Whilst on the Moon, Dougal falls in a puddle and his dye washes off, revealing his true identity. The pair begin to fight, but manage to make it to the rocket. Dougal manages to make it safely to Earth with a parachute, while Buxton, still in the rocket, crashes inside the factory. Upon finding out about "Blue Peter's" true identity, Madam Blue becomes infuriated, causing a lightning storm around the factory, and strips Buxton of his title. Dougal frees everyone from the prison cell, but as they escape, Brian tries to tell Dougal that they've forgotten something. Brian takes it upon himself to reenter the factory on his own, only for the factory to collapse to the ground.

The group return to the magic garden, and come across a tearfully remorseful Buxton. When Dougal tells the gang what happened to Brian, they all mourn for their friend, causing Buxton to "blush for shame", revealing his true colour to be white. Brian then shows up alive and well and reveals that he brought back Zebedee's magic moustache. After this, Mr. MacHenry uses magic to makes it snow and Mr. Rusty gives everyone a ride on the magic roundabout.

Music
All music and songs were composed by Jose Baselli and were released on an LP in 1970, shortly after the movie's release in France. 17 tracks were composed for the film, nine of them being musical numbers featured in the movie.

Track Listing:

"Le Réveil de la forêt (ENG: The Awakening Of The Forest)
"L'intronisation en Ude (ENG: Induction Into Ude/Buxton's Song)
"La complainte de la grotte (ENG: The lament of the cave)
"La chorale des sucettes (ENG: The lollipop choir)
"Coquine Comptine (ENG: Naughty Tale/Florence it's a lovely morning)
"L'hymne aux couleurs (ENG: The hymn of colours)
"Berceuse pour un lit (ENG: Lullaby for bed)
"Symphonie du chat bleu (ENG: Blue cat symphony)
"Le bonjour du Pollux (ENG: Hello from Pollux)
"La complainte de Margotte (ENG: The lament of Margote)
"La valse des couleurs (ENG: The waltz of colours)
"La marche des martinets (ENG: The march of the swifts)
"Rendez-vous au manège (ENG: See you at the carousel)
"Promenade des sucettes (ENG: Walk of the lollipops)
"Ballade du train (ENG: Ballad of the train)
"Tcha tcha d'Ambroise (ENG: Ambroise's Cha Cha)
"Le tango du bleu (ENG: The tango of the blue)

Home video and other media releases
In 1970, an LP of Pollux et le Chat Bleu was released in France by Disques Somethin' Else (presented by the French distributor Valoria Films), a novelisation of the film written by Serge Danot was published in 1971 by Hachette Bibliothèque, and there has also been a French VHS release by PolyGram/Universal in 1994 and a DVD release from said company.

On January 1, 1972, Music for Pleasure released an abridged LP record of the soundtrack of Dougal and the Blue Cat in stereo (the original mono soundtrack was electronically enhanced for stereo effect) and a single of three songs from the film ('Florence it's a Lovely Morning/Florence's Sad Song/Success! King Buxton') sung by Eric Thompson.

In 1972, a storybook of the film was published by Jane Carruth (24 pages). There was also another storybook adaptation released around the same time by Dean and Sons, which was a different, more kid-friendly retelling of the story with very little resemblance to the original film.

PolyGram Video released the film on VHS in 1989 on their Channel 5 label. It was also re-released on the 4Front label in 1993 and by Second Sight films in 1999. A scriptbook, claiming to be the original screenplay, of the film by Eric Thompson was published by Bloomsbury Publishing PLC in 1999, and features stills from the film.

A restored and remastered print of Dougal and the Blue Cat was released on DVD in the UK on 1 November 2010. This release by Second Sight also features the original French version of the film Pollux et le Chat Bleu, interviews with Fenella Fielding, Phyllida Law and Emma Thompson, an overview by film critic Mark Kermode and a photo gallery featuring the original cinema lobby cards of the French release.

References

1972 films
1970 animated films
1970 films
1970s French animated films
Animated films about cats
British children's animated films
British children's fantasy films
British fantasy adventure films
French fantasy adventure films
French animated films
1970s stop-motion animated films
United Artists films
United Artists animated films
Animated films about dogs
1970s American films
1970s British films